The Macondo Awards are given by the Colombian Academy of Cinematography Arts and Sciences to honor achievement in Colombian cinema.

The awards are given annually since 2010 by the Academy, whose members include Colombian actors, directors, producers, and industry film technicians.

History
The first edition of the Macondo Awards was held in October 2010 at the Jorge Eliecer Gaitán Theatre. The award's name is based on Macondo, the fictional town in Gabriel García Márquez's novel, One Hundred Years of Solitude. The statuette was created by Roberto Cano and is based on the Macondo tree.

Awards

 Best Film (Mejor Película)
 Best Documentary (Mejor Documental)
 Best Director (Mejor Director)
 Best Original Screenplay (Mejor Guión Original)
 Best Lead Actor (Mejor Actor Principal)
 Best Lead Actress (Mejor Actriz Principal)
 Best Supporting Actor (Mejor Actor de Reparto)
 Best Supporting Actress (Mejor Actriz de Reparto)
 Best Cinematography (Mejor Fotografía)
 Best Editing (Mejor Montaje)
 Best Ibero-American Film (Mejor Película Iberoamericana)
 Best Original Score (Mejor Música Original)
 Best Original Song (Mejor Canción Original)
 Best Sound Design (Mejor Sonido)
 Best Art Direction (Mejor Dirección de Arte)
 Best Costume Design (Mejor Diseño de Vestuario)
 Best Makeup (Mejor Maquillaje)
 Best Short Film (Mejor Cortometraje)
 Best Animated Film (Mejor película de Animación)
 Lifetime Award (Premio a Toda una Vida)
 Audience Award (Premio del público)

Ceremonies

References

External links
 ACACC Official website 

Colombian film awards
Latin American cinema
Awards established in 2010
2010 establishments in Colombia